List of Korean car makers may refer to:
Automotive industry in North Korea
Automotive industry in South Korea
 List of automobile manufacturers of South Korea